Elections to Aylesbury Vale District Council were held on 3 May 2007.  The whole council was up for election and the Conservative Party held overall control of the council.

Results

|}

1 Conservative candidate was unopposed.

By ward

External links
2007 Aylesbury Vale election result

2007 English local elections
2007
2000s in Buckinghamshire